Ülo Laanoja (born 19 February 1953 Kanepi Selsoviet, Põlva District) is an Estonian politician. He was a member of VII Riigikogu.

References

Living people
1953 births
Members of the Riigikogu, 1992–1995